Tahiti competed at the 2011 FINA World Championships in Shanghai, China, July 16–31, 2011.

Open water swimming

Men

Swimming

French Polynesia qualified 3 swimmers.

Men

Women

References

2011 in French Polynesian sport
Nations at the 2011 World Aquatics Championships
French Polynesia at the World Aquatics Championships
Sport in Tahiti